The Moara Vlasiei Cricket Ground is a cricket ground in Moara Vlăsiei, Ilfov County, Romania. The ground was built between 2011 and 2013, and is the only turf ground in Romania. It hosted the 2019 Continental Cup, a five-team Twenty20 International (T20I) cricket tournament.

List of centuries

Twenty20 Internationals

List of five-wicket hauls

Twenty20 Internationals

See also
 Romania national cricket team
 Romania women's national cricket team

References

Sport in Romania